Crowdertown is an unincorporated community in Bath County, Virginia, in the United States.

References

Unincorporated communities in Bath County, Virginia
Unincorporated communities in Virginia

Crowdertown is a small community approximately one mile west of Hot Springs Virginia.  At one time (1950's) the community had twelve families living in the area.  There use to be a general store in the community owned and operated by Peter C. Helmintoller Sr. but it burned to the ground in the 1930's. The C&O Railroad ran through the community until it shut down in the 1970's.